Dick Alexander is an American sound engineer. He won two Academy Awards for Best Sound and was nominated for six more in the same category. He has worked on over 170 films and television shows since 1975.

Selected filmography
Alexander won two Academy Awards for Best Sound and was nominated for another six:

Won
 All the President's Men (1976)
 Bird (1988)

Nominated
 The Deep (1977)
 Tootsie (1982)
 Ladyhawke (1985)
 Heartbreak Ridge (1986)
 Lethal Weapon (1987)
 Unforgiven (1992)

References

External links
 

Year of birth missing (living people)
Living people
American audio engineers
Best Sound Mixing Academy Award winners
Emmy Award winners